Presidents of the Regional Government of the Azores are heads of government for the autonomous local authority of the Azores, since the Carnation Revolution that installed the democratic Third Portuguese Republic. The list below includes the leaders of the transitional regimes and those presidents designated after the institutionalization of the autonomy statute that provided the archipelago with its laws and democratic rights.

Following the first elections, held on 8 September 1976, the leader of the first party was installed as first President of the Government of the Azores (João Bosco Mota Amaral), responsible for forming his executive and cabinet to administer the functioning of the public service in the Azores.

Presidents
The numbering reflects the uninterrupted terms in office served by each president. For example, Carlos César served four consecutive terms and is counted as the third president (not the seventh, eighth, ninth or tenth presidents): the Roman numerals refer to the legislature that their terms encompassed. Altino Pinto de Magalhães served as the first and only president of the Regional Junta, the provisional government that functioned during the transition towards democracy. The Military Governor of the Azores, until 22 August 1975, he was selected to preside over the Junta Governativa dos Açores (Governing Junta of the Azores), a commission that developed the Azorean autonomy statute. This commission became extinct with the first duly elected Legislature and appointed Government of the Azores.

The current President of the Government of the Azores is José Manuel Bolieiro, which forged a deal between all rightwing parties despite polling second place in the Azorean regional election on 25 October 2020.

The colors indicate the political affiliation of each President.

See also
Regional Government of the Azores

Timeline

References
Notes

Sources
 

Politics of Portugal